Harold "Harry" Wootton (1896–1964) was an English footballer who played in the Football League for Crewe Alexandra and Stoke.

Career
Wootton started his career at Stafford Rangers before being signed by Second Division side Stoke just after World War I. He played just a single match for Stoke which came in a 2–0 defeat at home to Nottingham Forest in January 1920. He then re-joined Stafford where he spent three years before re entering league football with Crewe Alexandra, he was successful at Crewe as he made 132 league appearances in four years.

Career statistics
Source:

References

English footballers
Crewe Alexandra F.C. players
Stafford Rangers F.C. players
Stoke City F.C. players
English Football League players
1896 births
1964 deaths
Association football defenders
Sportspeople from Hanley, Staffordshire